Kincardineshire by-election may refer to:

 1872 Kincardineshire by-election
 1908 Kincardineshire by-election
 1919 Aberdeenshire and Kincardineshire Central by-election
 1939 Kincardineshire and Western Aberdeenshire by-election